Futsal has been a Southeast Asian Games sport since the 2007  edition.

Results

Men's tournament

Women's tournament

Medal tally

Men's tournament

Women's tournament

*All teams on the same position.

See also
 AFF Futsal Championship

External links
 ASEANfootball.org - SEA Games
 RSSSF - Football at the Southeast Asian Games (Men's Tournament)
 RSSSF - Football at the Southeast Asian Games (Women's Tournament)